3047 Goethe, provisional designation , is a bright background asteroid from the central regions of the asteroid belt, approximately  in diameter. It was discovered on 24 September 1960, by Dutch astronomer couple Ingrid and Cornelis van Houten on photographic plates taken by Dutch–American astronomer Tom Gehrels at the Palomar Observatory in California, United States. The asteroid was named after German poet Johann Wolfgang von Goethe.

Orbit and classification 

Goethe is a non-family asteroid of the main belt's background population. It orbits the Sun in the central asteroid belt at a distance of 2.6–2.7 AU once every 4 years and 3 months (1,569 days; semi-major axis of 2.64 AU). Its orbit has a low eccentricity of 0.03 and a low inclination of 2° with respect to the ecliptic. The body's observation arc begins with its official discovery observation at Palomar in September 1960.

Physical characteristics 

According to the survey carried out by the NEOWISE mission of NASA's Wide-field Infrared Survey Explorer, Goethe measures 5.846 kilometers in diameter and its surface has a notably high albedo of 0.362. As of 2018, no rotational lightcurve of Goethe has been obtained from photometric observations. The body's rotation period, pole and shape remain unknown.

Palomar–Leiden survey 

The survey designation "P-L" stands for Palomar–Leiden, named after Palomar Observatory and Leiden Observatory, which collaborated on the fruitful Palomar–Leiden survey in the 1960s. Gehrels used Palomar's Samuel Oschin telescope (also known as the 48-inch Schmidt Telescope), and shipped the photographic plates to Ingrid and Cornelis van Houten at Leiden Observatory where astrometry was carried out. The trio are credited with the discovery of several thousand asteroid discoveries.

Naming 

This minor planet was named after German poet and playwright Johann Wolfgang von Goethe (1749-1832). The official naming citation was published by the Minor Planet Center on 29 September 1985. The Goethe Basin on Mercury was also named in his honor.

References

External links 
 Asteroid Lightcurve Database (LCDB), query form (info )
 Dictionary of Minor Planet Names, Google books
 Asteroids and comets rotation curves, CdR – Observatoire de Genève, Raoul Behrend
 Discovery Circumstances: Numbered Minor Planets (1)-(5000) – Minor Planet Center
 
 

003047
Discoveries by Cornelis Johannes van Houten
Discoveries by Ingrid van Houten-Groeneveld
Discoveries by Tom Gehrels
6091
Named minor planets
3047 Goethe
19600924